This is a chronological list of Bill Evans tribute albums.
 1980: Seven Steps to Evans by Gordon Beck, Tony Oxley, Kenny Wheeler, Stan Sulzmann, Ron Mathewson
 1981: Elegy For Bill Evans by Richie Beirach
 1982: Bill Evans - A tribute by Chick Corea, George Shearing, Herbie Hancock, Jimmy Rowles, Teddy Wilson, Denny Zeitlin
 1982: Oracle's Destiny by Michel Petrucciani
 1986: Music of Bill Evans by the Kronos Quartet with Eddie Gómez and Jim Hall.
 1987: Dedicated to Bill Evans and Scott LaFaro by Larry Coryell and Miroslav Vitouš
 1990: Bill Evans by Paul Motian
 1990: Evanessence: Tribute to Bill Evans by Fred Hersch (reissued in 1998)
 1991: Bill Evans: A Tribute by Jimmy Rowles, McCoy Tyner, Herbie Hancock, John Lewis, Dave McKenna, et al. (Palo Alto Records)
1992: Bill Evans...Person We Knew by Larry Schneider and Andy LaVerne (SteepleChase)
 1992: Then Along Came Bill: A Tribute to Bill Evans by Sylvia Syms
 1993: Time Remembered: John McLaughlin Plays Bill Evans by John McLaughlin
 1994: Now & Then: A Tribute to Bill Evans by Mitchel Forman
 1994: Your Story: The Music of Bill Evans by Howard Alden
 1996: Turn Out The Stars – The Songs Of Bill Evans by Dominic Alldis
 1997: Conversations with Bill Evans by Jean-Yves Thibaudet
 1998: I Remember Bill: A Tribute to Bill Evans by Don Sebesky and Larry Coryell
 2000: Conviction: Thoughts Of Bill Evans by Roseanna Vitro
 2001: Blue in Green by Tierney Sutton
 2001: Evans Remembered by Enrico Pieranunzi
 2002: Homage To Bill Evans And Jim Hall by Luigi Tessarollo with Stefano Bollani
 2002: Play Bill Evans by the Danish Radio Jazz Orchestra & Jim McNeely
 2003: Bill Evans: Tribute to the Great Post-Bop Pianist by Paul Motian
 2006: Paz – Niño Josele and the music of Bill Evans by Niño Josele
 2008: Something for You: Eliane Elias Sings & Plays Bill Evans by Eliane Elias
 2009: Bill Evans Compositions Vol. 1 & Vol. 2 by Stefano Battaglia
 2012: Further Explorations by Chick Corea
 2013: To Bill Evans by Kerem Görsev
 2015: A tribute to Bill Evans by Monika Lang

 
Evans, Bill